Sanjian Town is a rural town in Lengshuijiang, Hunan Province, People's Republic of China.

Administrative division
The town is divided into 14 villages and 3 communities, the following areas: Nanyang Community, Sanjian Community, Shicao Community, Guangming Village, Jintang Village, Jiujiang Village, Lidu Village, Lianyan Village, Liu'er Village, Mushan Village, Shangqing Village, Shenlong Village, Shichuan Village, Xiwan Village, Xinwu Village, Yuyuan Village, and Zhanhe Village (南阳社区、三尖社区、石槽社区、光明村、金塘村、九江村、利渡村、连岩村、六二村、木山村、上青村、神龙村、石船村、西湾村、新屋村、裕沅村、粘禾村)

Transportation
The Provincial Highway S217 is a north-south highway passing through the town.

References

External links

Divisions of Lengshuijiang